Stéphane Landry Dimy (born 12 November 1980) is an Ivorian footballer who currently plays as a goalkeeper for Africa Sports National.

Career 
He was signed on 1 July 2008 by Africa Sports National; he was transferred from EFYM (Ecole de Football Yéo Martial), formerly between January 2006 was member from ASEC Mimosas.

Dimy played for ASEC Mimosas in the 2003 CAF Champions League group stages, scoring an own goal in the match away to Ismaily.

References 

1980 births
Living people
Ivorian footballers
Ivory Coast international footballers
Footballers from Abidjan
ASEC Mimosas players
Africa Sports d'Abidjan players
Association football goalkeepers